Kemppainen is a Finnish surname. Notable people with the surname include:

 Antti-Jussi Kemppainen (born 1989), Finnish freestyle skier
 Johan Kemp (né Kemppainen, 1881–1941), Finnish gymnast
 Joonas Kemppainen (born 1988), Finnish ice hockey player
 Marko Kemppainen (born 1976), Finnish sport shooter
 Roosa Kemppainen, a character in the Finnish television series Salatut elämät
 Tuulikki Pyykkönen (born 1963), Finnish cross-country skier

Finnish-language surnames